Goytre United Football Club is a Welsh football club based in Goytre, near Port Talbot. They play in the Cymru South.  Despite winning Division One of the Welsh Football League in 2005–06 and 2007–08 they were not promoted to the Welsh Premier League.

Their home stadium is the Glenhafod Park Stadium.

History

In the spring of 1963 what funds the club had were handed to football secretary Boris Suhanski. Utilising these funds Goytre United Football Club was reborn. The club were members of the Port Talbot and District Football League but were promoted to the South Wales Amateur League in the late sixties. After a successful opening spell things became more difficult and the club was eventually relegated back into the Port Talbot League in the late seventies.

In 1982 the Goytre United AFC Social Club opened.

A period of ten years passed when the club competed in the Port Talbot and District League. During this time the club grew in stature on and off the field and in 1988 was re-elected back into the South Wales Amateur League. In the 1989–90 season the club secured promotion to the First Division of the South Wales Amateur League. Also in this year a 350 all-seating grandstand was built.

In the 1990–91 season the club were promoted to the Welsh Football League and on 24 August 1991 played their first match against Milford United. Since the club's elevation into the Welsh League, steady improvements have been made both on and off the pitch and in 2000 floodlights were erected. In the 2003–2004 season the club attained its highest position within the League when it ended the season in the runners-up spot in division one and just missed out on promotion to the Welsh Premier League.

In the 2004–05 season the club won the League Challenge Cup for the first time at Ton Pentre. Further history was made in the 2005–06 season when the club lifted the Welsh League First Division Championship, only losing three games. However, they chose to remain in the Welsh League First Division for the 2006–07 season.  Normally, the top clubs from each of the two feeder leagues (the Welsh League First Division and the Cymru Alliance) are promoted subject to an application for membership of the Welsh Premier League being received and accepted and the stadium and infrastructure safety criteria of the League being met. Goytre United elected not to apply for promotion, and the First Division runners-up, Neath Athletic, failed to meet the stadium criteria and had their bid for promotion rejected. 

In the 2006–07 season, the reserve team won the Welsh League Reserve West Division for the first time in the club's history, guided by former team player/manager Paul Wiseman.

In 2007–08 they won the Welsh Football League again, but once more they declined to apply for promotion to the Welsh Premier League.

The following year the same situation occurred with Goytre winning the Welsh Football League for a third time, but were still denied promotion.

In 2022/23, they decided they wanted to be Llantwit Major AFC, and stole as many of their players as possible.

Honours

Welsh Football League
Champions: 2005–06, 2007–08, 2009–10

Port Talbot League Challenge Cup
Finalists: 1985–86, 1988–89

Port Talbot League Premier Division
Runners-up: 1988–89

South Wales Amateur League Division 2
Runners-up: 1989–90

Port Talbot Challenge Cup
Winners: 1992–93

Welsh League Division Three
Runners-up: 1993–94

Welsh League Reserve Division
Runners-up: 1994–95

Welsh League Division Two
Runners-up: 1995–96

Welsh League Reserve Division Cup
Finalists: 1996–97

Welsh League Division One
Runner-up: 2003–04

Welsh League Shamrock Travel Cup
Winners: 2004–05

Current squad
As of 20 January 2016

Staff
 Manager:  Lee John
 Head coach:  Corey Glover
 Physio:  Chris Miller

Reserve Squad history

With the success of the first team, in the summer of 2010 founded by Daniel Jenkins and Ryan "Gammon" Williams the Goytre United Reserve squad was made. The squad entered the Port Talbot Reserve Division and claimed a respectable 8th-place finish in the league as well as a quarter final spot in the Port Talbot knockout cup. Notable acclaims for the season included beating champions Bay View 4–2 at the Glenhafod, Bayviews only defeat of the season. The 2011–12 season started off with big signings for the club in the form of Mikkel Mccalmon, Liam McGinley and Richard Phelps. With the new additions the reserve squad won not only the league but also the Port Talbot knockout cup beating local rivals Tata Steel 3–0 in the final. The 2012–13 season ended on 9 May with Goytre yet again doing the double with the league and cup. Goytre played Cornelly in the final with the scoreline at 5–2 to Goytre.

The start of the 2013–14 season saw the Goytre Reserves promoted from the Port Talbot Reserve division to the Port Talbot & District Premier Division. Masked with the challenge of playing larger and more experienced teams Goytre made signings including center forward Liam Williams however the side lost key players such as Mikkel Mccalmon, Richard Phelps & Josh Beckingham to the Baglan Dragons. The season started slow for Goytre but the side got its usual rhythm back with the blossoming partnership of David "Bolt" Jones & Liam McGinley up top. The club finished in a highly respectable 3rd place in the new top flight division as well as narrowly missing out in the semi-finals of the Port Talbot Challenge cup to eventual winners Glyncorrwg FC.

The 2014–15 season saw the return of previous players Mikkel Mccalmon, Richard Phelps & Josh Beckingham from the Baglan Dragons however saw the transfers of John Ashcroft and Rhys Harris to TATA Steel & the departure of goalkeeper Peter Watkins. Once again the team had a relatively slow start to the campaign managing only draws with bottom ranked side Fairfield Wednesday and Port Talbot Tigers however in Goytre fashion the season come down to the last few weeks with Goytre going unbeaten in their last 5 games to win the Port Talbot Premier Division Title for the first time. The league went neck and neck with last years runners up Glyncorrwg FC who after a loss to Goytre on the penultimate game of the season again went on to slip to another loss to Gwnfi United. This meant Goytre needed a win to secure the title which they completed with a 1–0 win against Croeserw Athletic. The sides run in the Port Talbot Challenge Cup came to an end in the second round after losing on penalties to Trefelin BGC First team after a 1–1 draw in 120 minutes despite playing a majority of the match with 10 men.

Reserve squad

Staff
 Manager:  Andrew Evans
 1st Team Coach:  Andrew Evans
 1st Team Coach:  John Ashcroft
 Physio:  Ryan Harris

References

Football clubs in Wales
Sport in Port Talbot
Welsh Football League clubs
Cymru South clubs
Port Talbot Football League clubs
South Wales Amateur League clubs